The 1994 French rugby league Oceania tour was a three test tour by the France national rugby league team. The French team played single tests against Papua New Guinea, Australia and Fiji, losing all three games.

Team
The French were coached by Jean-Christophe Vergeynst and captained by veteran halfback Patrick Entat.

 Patrick Acroue
 Theo Anast
 Ezzedine Attia
 Cyril Baudouin
 Pascal Bomati
 Pierre Chamorin
 David Despin
 Patrick Entat
 Franck Esponda
 David Fraisse
 Jean Frison
 Jean-Marc Garcia

 Charles Giorgi
 Christophe Grandjean
 Georges Grandjean
 Bernard Llong
 Frantz Martial
 Christophe Martinez
 Claude Sirvent
 Stephane Tena
 Patrick Torreilles
 Thierry Valero
 Jean-Marc Vincent

Papua New Guinea vs France
This would be Papua New Guinea's 5th test win in their 34th test (and their second win over France) since gaining test match status in 1975.

Australia vs France
For the Australian's, Brett Mullins, David Fairleigh, Tim Brasher, Paul McGregor and Mark Hohn all made their test debut, though Brasher had been Australia's fullback in the 1992 World Cup Final at the famous Wembley Stadium (at the time, tests and World Cup games were counted separately in a players records).

Although the name had been used for 86 years, this was the first test other than during a Kangaroo Tour where the Australian team was officially called The Kangaroos.

In the French team's first test in Australia since 1990 and in what would prove to be Australian captain Mal Meninga's final test in Australia after announcing that he would retire at the end of 1994, the Australian Kangaroos racked up a record winning margin in the first ever test match at Parramatta Stadium (and the first test in Sydney played at a suburban ground rather than a major venue) by defeating the hapless French 58–0. The scoreline could well have been higher (as much as 72–0) had Meninga (5/10) and Tim Brasher (0/2) been more accurate with their goal kicking.

Following the disaster of France's 1981 Australasian tour where the standard of the French teams play had dropped alarmingly resulting in poor attendances for the tests at Lang Park in Brisbane and the Sydney Cricket Ground, the Australian Rugby League had ruled that until they improved their game, the Australian team would no longer play tests against the French in the two capital cities. The 1990 test, France's first in Australia since 1981 (following the cancelled 1987 tour) had been played on a freezing night in the New South Wales country town of Parkes in front of a capacity crowd of 12,384 fans at the Pioneer Oval. The attendance for that game, and that it was Mal Meninga's last test match in Australia, saw the ARL relax their stance and allow the game to be played in Sydney.

Despite the French team not being regarded as a top line international team any more (this was France's 11th loss in a row in all tests since 1992 and their 10th loss in a row to Australia since 1981), the game was played in front of a ground record attendance of 27,318 which as would remain the record attendance for the venue until it was demolished in 2017. This was also the highest attendance for an Australia vs France test since 54,290 attended the 1968 World Cup Final at the Sydney Cricket Ground.

This was the only rugby league test match played in Australia during 1994. At the end of the year the Australian's would embark on their successful 1994 Kangaroo tour of Great Britain and France during which they again defeated France 74–0 in Béziers. At the time the 74–0 score was a world record test match victory eclipsing the 58–0 win here in Sydney. Of this test team, only reserve forward Mark Hohn was not selected to the 1994 Kangaroo Tour.

France would not play another test against Australia until 2004 while they would not play again in Australia until the 2008 Rugby League World Cup.

Fiji vs France

In what was Fiji's first official rugby league test match, they defeated the French team 20–12 at the National Stadium in Fiji's capital city of Suva.

Aftermath
The French team were in the grip of a 22 match losing streak (which included two drawn tests), not having won a test since defeating Papua New Guinea 28–14 in Carcassonne on 24 November 1991. They would not win another rugby league test match until defeating South Africa 30–17 in Arles on 6 December 1997.

See also
 Papua New Guinea national rugby league team
 Australia national rugby league team
 Fiji national rugby league team
 Australia vs France in rugby league

References

France national rugby league team tours
Rugby league tours of Papua New Guinea
Rugby league tours of Australia
Australia–France sports relations
Fiji–France sports relations
France–Papua New Guinea sports relations
Rugby league tour of Oceania
French rugby league tour of Oceania
Fra
1994 in Fijian sport
FRen